Sir Robert Abbott Hadfield, 1st Baronet FRS (28 November 1858 in Sheffield – 30 September 1940 in Surrey) was an English metallurgist, noted for his 1882 discovery of manganese steel, one of the first steel alloys.  He also invented silicon steel, initially for mechanical properties (patents in 1886) which have made the alloy a material of choice for springs and some fine blades, though it has also become important in electrical applications for its magnetic behaviour.

Life
Hadfield was born 28 November 1858 in Sheffield. Hadfield's father, also named Robert Hadfield, owned Hadfield's Steel Foundry in Sheffield and was one of the first manufacturers of steel castings.  The younger Hadfield took over the business in 1888 and built the firm into one of the largest foundries in the world.  Between 1898 and 1939 he lived at Parkhead House in Whirlow, Sheffield. He published over 200 papers on his metallurgical research.

In the 1930s he employed record breaking motorcyclist Florence Blenkiron as a secretary and office manager.

He died 30 September 1940 in Surrey.

Honours

In 1899, Hadfield was made Master Cutler.  He was knighted on 21 July 1908 and created a baronet, of Sheffield in the West Riding of the County of York on 26 June 1917.  He was elected as a Fellow of the Royal Society in 1909, a member of the Royal Swedish Academy of Sciences in 1912 and an honorary member of the Academy of Sciences of the USSR in 1933. In 1939 he was awarded the Freedom of the City of Sheffield.

He was awarded a Telford Medal by the Institution of Civil Engineers in 1888, the John Scott Medal of The Franklin Institute in 1891 and the Bessemer Gold Medal in 1904. He received the John Fritz Medal in 1921 and the Albert Medal (RSA) in 1935, both for his contributions to metallurgy.

He is commemorated in the Sir Robert Hadfield Building at the University of Sheffield, which contains the Departments of Materials Science and Engineering and Chemical and Biological Engineering. There is also a wing at the Northern General Hospital named after him.

References

Further reading

External links
Austenitic manganese steels

1858 births
1940 deaths
Master Cutlers
British metallurgists
Fellows of the Royal Society
Knights Bachelor
Baronets in the Baronetage of the United Kingdom
Members of the Royal Swedish Academy of Sciences
Bessemer Gold Medal
John Fritz Medal recipients
Foreign associates of the National Academy of Sciences
Honorary Members of the USSR Academy of Sciences